The 2012–13 Mordovia Saransk season was their 1st season back in the Russian Premier League, the highest tier of association football in Russia. They finished the season in 15th place, meaning they were relegated back to the Russian National Football League after only one season in the Premier League. Mordovia also participated in the 2012–13 Russian Cup, getting knocked out at the Round of 16 stage by Zenit St. Petersburg.

Squad

Youth squad

Transfers

Summer

In:

Out:

Winter

In:

Out:

Competitions

Russian Premier League

Matches

League table

Russian Cup

Squad statistics

Appearances and goals

|-
|colspan="14"|Players away from the club on loan:

|-
|colspan="14"|Players who appeared for Mordovia Saransk no longer at the club:

|}

Top scorers

Disciplinary record

References

FC Mordovia Saransk seasons
Mordovia Saransk